Silver Lake, New York may refer to:

 Silver Lake, Clinton County, New York - a lake in Clinton County, New York
Silver Lake, Orange County, New York - a lake in town of Wallkill, New York
 Silver Lake, Otsego County, New York - a hamlet in the town of Pittsfield, New York
 Silver Lake, Wyoming County, New York - a community in the town of Castile, New York
 Silver Lake (Wyoming County, New York) - a lake in Wyoming County
 Silver Lake, Staten Island - a neighborhood in Staten Island, New York
 Silver Lake (Woodridge, New York) - a lake in Sullivan County